Emmanuel Wanyonyi (born 1 August 2004) is a Kenyan middle-distance runner who specializes in the 800 metres. At the age of 18, he placed fourth at the 2022 World Athletics Championships. Wanyonyi won the gold medal at the 2021 World Under-20 Championships, setting a championship record in the process.

Achievements

Circuit wins
 Diamond League
 2022 (800 m): Rabat Meeting International

References

External links
 

2004 births
Living people
Kenyan male middle-distance runners
World Athletics U20 Championships winners